Cestrum tomentosum is a plant in the genus Cestrum that ranges throughout central and South America. It process high fragrant pink flowers followed by pink colored berries. All parts are poisonous if eaten.

See also
Cestrum

References

tomentosum
Flora of South America